Hu Yadong (Chinese: 胡亚东, born 3 October 1968) is a female Chinese rower. She competed at 1988 Seoul Olympic Games. Together with her teammates, she won a silver medal in the women's coxed four, and a bronze medal in the women's eight.

References

Chinese female rowers
Rowers at the 1988 Summer Olympics
Olympic rowers of China
Olympic silver medalists for China
Olympic bronze medalists for China
Living people
1968 births
Olympic medalists in rowing
Asian Games medalists in rowing
Rowers at the 1990 Asian Games
Medalists at the 1988 Summer Olympics
Asian Games gold medalists for China
Medalists at the 1990 Asian Games
World Rowing Championships medalists for China
20th-century Chinese women
21st-century Chinese women